Viscum album is a species of mistletoe in the family Santalaceae, commonly known as European mistletoe, common mistletoe or simply as mistletoe (Old English mistle). It is native to Europe and western and southern Asia.

Viscum album is a hemiparasite on several species of trees, from which it draws water and nutrients.  It has a significant role in European mythology, legends, and customs.  In modern times, it is commonly featured in Christmas decoration and symbology.  (V. album is found only rarely in North America, as an introduced species; its cultural roles are usually fulfilled by the similar native species Phoradendron leucarpum.)

Description
It is a hemi-parasitic evergreen shrub, which grows on the stems of other trees. This species is dioecious and the insect-pollinated flowers are inconspicuous, yellowish-green,  diameter. The fruit is a white or yellow berry containing one (very rarely several) seed embedded in the very sticky, glutinous fruit pulp.

It is commonly found in the crowns of broad-leaved trees, particularly apple, lime (linden), hawthorn and poplar.

European mistletoe is the only multicellular organism to not have a functioning respiratory complex I in its electron transport chain, a protein that's essential for the creation of useful energy for its cells. It is believed to survive by obtaining adenosine triphosphate and energy-rich compounds from its host as well as reorganizing its other respiratory complexes and slowing its growth and energy requirements.

Classification
The mistletoe was one of the many species originally described by Linnaeus. Its species name is the Latin adjective albus "white". It and the other members of the genus Viscum were originally classified in the mistletoe family Viscaceae, but this family has since been sunk into the larger family Santalaceae.

Subspecies
Several subspecies are commonly accepted. They differ in fruit colour, leaf shape and size, and most obviously in the host trees utilised.
Viscum album subsp. abietis (Wiesb.) Abromeit. Central Europe. On Abies.
Viscum album subsp. album. Europe, southwest Asia east to Nepal. Fruit white; leaves . On Malus, Populus, Tilia, and less often on numerous other species, including (rarely) Quercus.
Viscum album subsp. austriacum (Wiesb.) Vollmann. Fruit yellow; leaves . Central Europe. On Larix, Pinus, Picea.
Viscum album subsp. meridianum (Danser) D.G.Long. Southeast Asia. Fruit yellow; leaves . On Acer, Carpinus, Juglans, Prunus, Sorbus.
Viscum album subsp. creticum has recently been described from eastern Crete. Fruit white; leaves short. On Pinus brutia.
Viscum album subsp. coloratum Kom. is treated by the Flora of China as a distinct species Viscum coloratum (Kom) Nakai.

Toxicity
European mistletoe is potentially fatal, in a concentrated form, and people can become seriously ill from eating the berries.

The toxic lectin viscumin has been isolated from Viscum album. Viscumin is a cytotoxic protein (ribosome inactivating protein, or RIP) that binds to galactose residues of cell surface glycoproteins and may be internalised by endocytosis. Viscumin strongly inhibits protein synthesis by inactivating the 60 S ribosomal subunit. The structure of this protein is very similar to other RIPs, showing the most resemblance to ricin and abrin.

Some birds have immunity to the poison and enjoy the berries, especially the mistle thrush which is named for its favourite food.

Culture, folklore and mythology
European mistletoe features in many myths and legends from early written sources, into the modern period. In cultures across pre-Christian Europe, mistletoe was often seen as a representation of divine male essence (and thus romance, fertility and vitality).

Celtic
According to Pliny the Elder, the Celts considered it a remedy for barrenness in animals and an antidote to poison, and sacred when growing on oak trees (where it is rare). He describes a Celtic ritual sacrifice and banquet at which a druid dressed in white would climb an oak tree to collect mistletoe using a golden sickle.  This legend is often referred to in the popular Asterix comic books, where the druid Getafix is often seen collecting mistletoe with a golden sickle.

Modern druids in the Americas may use the native American Phoradendron leucarpum as well as other mistletoe species.

Germanic

According to the 13th century Prose Edda, the goddess Frigg had everything swear an oath not to hurt her son Baldr, except for mistletoe, because "it seemed too young"  to her for that. After this at the thing, other gods had fun by shooting at him, or hurling stones, without him being injured at all. Loki, wishing him dead, tricked Baldr's brother, the blind god Höðr into throwing mistletoe at Baldr, killing him.

In the version of the story in Gesta Danorum, Baldr and Höðr are rival suitors for Nanna, and Höðr kills Baldr with a sword named Mistilteinn (Old Norse "mistletoe"). In addition, a sword by the same name also appears in Hervarar saga ok Heiðreks and Hrómundar saga Gripssonar.

Ancient Greek and Roman
Mistletoe figured prominently in Greek mythology, and is believed to be the Golden Bough of Aeneas, ancestor of the Romans. Also in Greek mythology mistletoe was used by heroes to access the underworld. The Romans associated mistletoe with peace, love and understanding and hung it over doorways to protect the household.

Christian 

When Christianity became widespread in Europe after the 3rd century AD, the religious or mystical respect for the mistletoe plant was integrated to an extent into the new religion. In some way that is not presently understood, this may have led to the widespread custom of kissing under the mistletoe plant during the Christmas season. The earliest documented case of kissing under the mistletoe dates from 16th century England, a custom that was apparently very popular at that time.

Winston Graham reports a Cornish tradition that mistletoe was originally a fine tree from which the wood of the Cross was made, but afterwards it was condemned to live on only as a parasite.

Mistletoe is commonly used as a Christmas decoration, though such use was rarely alluded to until the 18th century. According to custom, the mistletoe must not touch the ground between its cutting and its removal as the last of Christmas greens at Candlemas. It may remain hanging throughout the year, often to preserve the house from lightning or fire, until it is replaced the following Christmas Eve. The tradition has spread throughout the English-speaking world, but is largely unknown in the rest of Europe. (The similar native species Phoradendron leucarpum is used in North America in lieu of the European Viscum album.)

According to an old Christmas custom, a man and a woman who meet under a hanging of mistletoe were obliged to kiss. The custom may be of Scandinavian origin. It was alluded to as common practice in 1808 and described in 1820 by American author Washington Irving in his The Sketch Book of Geoffrey Crayon, Gent.:

In Germany, the Christmas tradition is that people who kiss under mistletoe will have an enduring love or are bound to marry one another.

Other

Every year, the UK town of Tenbury Wells holds a mistletoe festival and crowns a 'Mistletoe Queen'.

Mistletoe is the county flower of Herefordshire. It was voted such in 2002 following a poll by the wild plant conservation charity Plantlife.

Uses

Flavoring
Mistletoe is an ingredient of biska, a pomace brandy-based liquor made in Istria.

Alternative medicine

Mistletoe leaves and young twigs are used by herbalists, and preparations made from them are popular in Europe, especially in Germany, for attempting to treat circulatory and respiratory system problems. Use of mistletoe extract in the treatment of cancer originated with Rudolf Steiner, the founder of Anthroposophy.

Although laboratory and animal experiments have suggested that mistletoe extract may affect the immune system and be able to kill some kinds of cancer cells, there is little evidence of its benefit to people with cancer.

Bird trapping
The sticky juice of mistletoe berries was used to make birdlime, an adhesive to trap small animals or birds.

The Latin word  is the source of viscous.

Gallery

See also 
Christmas decoration
List of unproven and disproven cancer treatments

References

Further reading

External links

 Distribution maps of Viscum album
 Flora of Pakistan: Viscum album
 Viscum album subsp. creticum

album
Parasitic plants
Medicinal plants
Plants described in 1753
Taxa named by Carl Linnaeus
Subshrubs
Dioecious plants
Poisonous plants